Rafael Carbajal (born September 30, 1960) is a Uruguayan former footballer and current manager.

His playing career was mostly spent in the National Soccer League, and concluded in the successor league the Canadian Professional Soccer League. After retiring from the game he made the transition to the managerial side, where he initially began managing in the NSL, and later in the CPSL.

In 2002, he went abroad in order to gain additional experience with his involvement with several Italian clubs. He later returned to the Canadian Soccer League, and was recognized with the CSL Coach of the Year award in 2008. In 2010, he was part-owner of Milltown FC, and also served as head coach in the club's inaugural run in the CSL.  He would later serve as an assistant coach to the Canadian national team, U-23, U-20, and U-18 teams. In 2016, he managed in the Uruguayan Segunda División for Canadian S.C..

He was instrumental in the creation of League1 Ontario where he served as Technical Director in 2014.

Playing career 
In 1981, Carbajal went to Canada to sign with Toronto Croatia of the National Soccer League. During his tenure within the NSL he played with Bradford Marshlanders, Toronto Italia, Nacional Latino,  Panhellenic, First Portuguese. He won the NSL Goalkeeper of the Year award three times.

Coaching career
Carbajal went into coaching first as a player/coach with Nacional Latino in 1986, then as a goalkeeper coach for Scarborough Astros in 1994. In 1999, he returned to competitive soccer to play and coach the North York Astros in the Canadian Professional Soccer League. In 2003, he went to Italy to first coach the Faenza Calcio U-15 team. Then he was promoted to assistant coach, and eventually head coach in 2005. In 2007, he returned to coach North York Astros, and completely transformed the team from a struggling team to a playoff contender. In his first year, he secured a postseason, and in his second season led the team to a second-place finish in the National Division.

The league awarded Carbajal with the CSL Coach of the Year award in 2008. In 2009, he was appointed head coach for CSL giants Serbian White Eagles. He secured the International Division title for the club, but was released by the club before the playoffs. In 2010, Milltown FC announced the signing of Carbajal as head coach. In his first season with Milltown the club finished fourth in the overall standings with the second best defensive record. 

In 2010, he served as assistant coach for Canada men's national under-20 soccer team. In 2012, he served as assistant coach for Canada men's national under-23 soccer team, and in January 2014 he was appointed assistant coach to Benito Floro for the Canada men's national soccer team. In 2013, he succeeded Dino Lopez as the Interim Technical Director for Oakville Soccer Club. In 2016, he returned to his native country to manage Canadian S.C. of the Uruguayan Segunda División. 

In June 2021, he was named the head coach for Tacuary in Paraguay's Tercera División.

Honours

Manager

Club 
 Canadian Soccer League International Division: 2009

Individual 
 Canadian Soccer League Coach of the Year: 2008

References

External links 
 

1960 births
Living people
Uruguayan footballers
Uruguayan football managers
Toronto Croatia players
Toronto Italia players
Toronto First Portuguese players
North York Astros players
Canadian National Soccer League players
Canadian Soccer League (1998–present) players
North York Astros coaches
Serbian White Eagles FC managers
Club Tacuary managers
Canadian Soccer League (1998–present) managers
Association football goalkeepers
Association football goalkeeping coaches
Uruguayan expatriate footballers
Uruguayan expatriate football managers
Uruguayan expatriate sportspeople in Canada
Expatriate soccer players in Canada
Expatriate soccer managers in Canada